Langatte (Lorraine Franconian Lan(g)d) is a commune in the Moselle department in Grand Est in north-eastern France. In 1805 it was the site of the Battle of Landbach between the French and the anti French coalition.

Langatte is located in Southeastern Moselle near Sarrebourg. It is one of the communes who share the Étang du Stock (a pond) with Kerprich-aux-Bois, Diane-Capelle, Rhodes and Fribourg. A leisure centre and a campsite have been installed near of the pond. The new LGV Est part connecting Baudrecourt (where the High Speed Line ended before 2016) and Vendenheim has been built in Southern Moselle including Langatte and since 2016, TGV trains pass by here every day to connect Strasbourg, Paris and other destinations around France and Germany.

Notable people
 René François Rohrbacher

See also
 Communes of the Moselle department

References

External links
 

Communes of Moselle (department)